Zhutang may refer to the following places in mainland China or Taiwan:

 Zhutang, Jiangyin (祝塘镇), town in Jiangyin City, Jiangsu
 Zhutang, Changhua (竹塘鄉), township of Changhua County, Taiwan